Aldershot was the name of a number of steamships

, built for Watts, Watts & Co
, built for the London, Brighton and South Coast Railway as SS Brittany. Renamed Aldershot in 1933 by the Southern Railway
, built as Liberty ship Noah Brown, renamed Aldershot in 1955

Ship names